Matt Baxter (born 6 August 1994) is a New Zealand long-distance runner.

In 2019, he competed in the senior men's race at the 2019 IAAF World Cross Country Championships held in Aarhus, Denmark. He finished in 46th place.

References

External links 
 

Living people
1994 births
Place of birth missing (living people)
New Zealand male long-distance runners
New Zealand male cross country runners